The bird genus Hirundo is a group of passerines in the family Hirundinidae (swallows and martins). The genus name is Latin for a swallow. These are the typical swallows, including the widespread barn swallow. Many of this group have blue backs, red on the face and sometimes the rump or nape, and whitish or rufous underparts. With fifteen species this genus is the largest in its family.

Taxonomy
The genus Hirundo was introduced in 1758 by the Swedish naturalist Carl Linnaeus in the tenth edition of his Systema Naturae. The genus name is the Latin word for a swallow. Linnaeus included eight species in the genus and of these William Swainson designated the barn swallow (Hirundo rustica) as the type species.

Extant species
The genus contains fifteen species. The linear sequence is based on two molecular phylogenetic studies published in 2005 and 2018.

Extinct species
There are at least two fossil species included in this genus:
†Hirundo gracilis (late Miocene of Polgardi, Hungary)
†Hirundo major (Pliocene of Csarnota, Hungary)

Former species
Some authorities, either presently or formerly, recognize several additional species as belonging to the genus Hirundo including:
 West African swallow (as Hirundo domicella)

Distribution and habitat
All of the species are found in the Old World, although one, the barn swallow, is cosmopolitan, also occurring in the Americas.

Gallery

References

 
Bird genera
Taxa named by Carl Linnaeus

cs:Vlaštovka